Canadaland is a Canadian company that operates a news site and a network of podcasts. It was founded by Jesse Brown in 2013. Canadaland has produced podcasts on Canadian media, art and culture, cooking, medicine, and politics. Podcasts include the original Canadaland podcast, Commons, Cool Mules, The White Saviors, and Thunder Bay.

Podcast production has been funded partly through advertisements, and since 2014, through the crowdfunding site, Patreon.

A year after the podcast was launched, it was attracting about 10,000 listeners every week. By late 2018, Canadaland's five podcasts reached 100,000 weekly listeners. In 2020, the podcasts were downloaded over 9 million times in 2020, making it one of the most popular podcasts in Canada.

Podcasts
Canadaland podcast was launched by Jesse Brown in the autumn of 2013. By 2015, it had become a "podcast network and a news organization with staff". The original Canadaland podcast covered predominantly Canadian media and media criticism. By September 2018, the Canadaland podcast network also included Commons, a politics podcast Imposter, an art and art criticism podcast; Oppo, a politics podcast; Taste Buds, a food and food critic podcast; and Wag the Doug, an ad-hoc, irregularly scheduled podcast about Ontario Premier Doug Ford.

Canadaland (original) podcast 
Brown launched his podcast and blog called Canadaland in October 2013. In an article in the Times Colonist, Mike Devlin described Brown as the "controversial host of the popular Canadaland podcast and crowdfunded news site." Devlin wrote that Brown was "polarizing...mostly because of his irreverent critiques and smart-ass attitude" whose "media and cultural critiques" are handled in a "gloves-off manner." According to Devlin, Brown became "something of a bad boy in Ontario" for attacking Canadian media "sacred cows" such as The Globe and Mail. In his 2014 article in The Walrus, Brown described how guest journalists were reluctant to appear on the program until his "first big scoop", less than six months after the podcast was launched. Brown, and Canadaland, by extension, earned "credentials", and "journalistic credibility" with stories such as the February 2014 "scoop" on The National anchor Peter Mansbridge.

Since the fall of 2013, Canadaland "has spilled secrets about newsroom misdeeds, broken stories about TV journalists taking money from groups they cover, and challenged reporting that [Jesse Brown] he believe[d] has fallen short." This included the February 2014 story about Peter Mansbridge, who had been paid $28,000 to speak at a December 2012 Canadian Association of Petroleum Producers (CAPP) event. This raised conflict of interest concerns as Mansbridge had accepted money from an entity with a vested interest in the oil sands issue, a topic Mansbridge regularly reported on from a national platform. The story got picked up on by The Huffington Post, Vice, and reporter Andrew Mitrovica, forcing Mansbridge to address the issue, sparking a lively debate in the Canadian mainstream media outlets. CBC Ombudsman Esther Enkin investigated the issue, concluding there was no problem with Mansbridge taking money to speak before an oil lobby group, though adding that CBC should "think about the appearance of getting paid by interest groups who are likely to feature prominently in the news".

Although, Canadaland does not believe that their show was the sole catalyst, by April 2014 the Canadian Broadcasting Corporation announced changes in its rules regarding speaking engagements for its journalists.

Commons
In 2015, Commons was launched as a "politics show for people who have been neglected by legacy media" with "activist and journalist" Desmond Cole and Andray Domise as hosts. According to a 2015 article by Jonathan Goldsbie, at a meeting held as part of a province-wide public consultation on carding, Cole confronted then-Toronto police chief Mark Saunders on "whether he ha[d] data to back up his assertions about [its] usefulness". In the same article, Domise described an incident that took place when he was fifteen. After being stopped by police who asked if he was carrying weed in his backpack, he ended up "cuffed, on the ground, while the officers dumped out the contents of my backpack. In front of my peers at school." In 2015, Elizabeth May appeared as a guest on The Commons. On their December 16 podcast, Cole interviewed three family members of missing and murdered Indigenous women (MMIW). In 2015, over 12,000 listeners downloaded the show weekly.

In 2016, the most downloaded episodes of the Commons were "Legal Weed is Bad for Poor People", "Don't Let Harper Happen Here: Wab Kinew on Entering Politics", "White Men Gotta Speak on This", "The Government Finally Admitted They Illegally Spy On Us and Nobody Cares", "Drunk on Liberal Power", and "Kellie Leitch on Anti-Canadian Values."

Now hosted by Arshy Mann, the focus of The Commons will be on corruption in Canada in the 2018–2019 season.

The Imposter
Canadaland's art and art criticism show, The Imposter was launched in 2016. In their first year, the most downloaded episodes were "Brushes With Drake", "Spoiler Alert", "Degrassiland", "Tanya Tagaq is Unreconciled", and "Sex Canoe". Artist, Aliya Pabani, is the show's host and producer.

OPPO
OPPO, a politics podcast, was launched on February 6, 2018, with journalists Jen Gerson and Justin Ling as co-hosts, presenting opposing views on various politic-related topics. The producer is David Crosbie. Justin Ling left the podcast and was replaced by Sandy Garossino in 2020. OPPO ended in early 2021, with Gerson saying the show had 'run its course'.

DDx
In March 2018, Canadaland launched DDx, medical podcast, which was the "first program from Canadaland'''s new branded podcast unit, Earshot, ranked as "one of the top medical podcasts in iTunes' Canadian and U.S. rankings".

Cool Mules

Cool Mules is a six-part true crime podcast hosted by Kasia Mychajlowycz that documents the cocaine smuggling of Slava Pastuk, while he is employed at Vice Media. The series included a series of exclusive interviews with Pastuk, who ultimately pleaded guilty and was sentenced to nine years in prison. It won a National Magazine Awards Gold Award for best podcast in 2021.

Thunder BayThunder Bay is a five-part podcast launched in 2018, hosted by Ryan McMahon. It builds on the investigation by Toronto Star reporter Tanya Talaga—published her 2017 book Seven Fallen Feathers: Racism, Death and Hard Truths in a Northern City. In Seven Fallen Feathers, Talaga described the deaths of seven youths in Thunder Bay, Ontario, revealing ineffective police investigations, and systemic racism, facing Indigenous youth, their families, and communities. The podcast critiques the city's authorities and their support of the Indigenous population.

The Backbench

Following the ending of OPPO, Canadaland was without a Canadian politics show. In 2021 Canadaland rebranded the OPPO podcast feed as The Backbench. The podcast releases bi-weekly, and features rotating guests discussing the top Canadian political stories of the day. These guests include former Liberal M.P. Celina Caesar-Chavannes, Jason Markusoff, Emilie Nicolas, Murad Hemmadi, Drew Brown, Stuart Thomson, Jaskaran Sandhu and Leena Minifie.The Backbench was formerly hosted by Fatima Syed. In September 2022, Mattea Roach was named the new host.

 The White Saviors 
In 2021 Canadaland published a five part podcast, narrated by Olusola Adeogun, called "The White Saviors" that included the highlights of their reporting on activities by WE Charity and WE Charity Scandal plus new content including interviews with whistleblowers and former staff. Prior to the airing of the podcast, Canadaland was served a statement of claim by Theresa Kielburger, mother of the founders of WE Charity.

Book: The Canadaland Guide to Canada
In her review of Jesse Brown's 2017 book The Canadaland Guide to Canada, author Charlotte Gray described Jesse Brown as a "crowdfunded media critic and self-described 'public irritant'" Gray cited Brown in describing Canada as "shapeless, beige haze," that we created and that "it's time we grew up and told the truth."

 Organization 

 Management and staff 
Canadaland's staff reporters include Arshy Mann, Allison Smith, Ryan McMahon, Jaren Kerr, and Jesse Brown.

Jesse Brown is the founder, host, and publisher. David Crosbie is the producer and host of OPPO and Short Cuts. Jen Gerson is an OPPO co-host, OPPO, Jonathan Goldsbie is the news editor and a co-host of Wag the Doug, Allie Graham is a producer, Justin Ling is a co-host of OPPO, Arshy Mann is a host and producer of the COMMONS. TK Matunda is a producer of the COMMONS. Ryan McMahon is the host of Thunder Bay. Kevin Sexton is the managing editor of podcasts. Allison Smith is the co-host of Wag the Doug. Funding Canadaland has been funded partly through advertisements, and since 2014, through the crowdfunding site, Patreon. Canadaland publishes an annual "Transparency Report" that details their finances.

Their most successful fundraising Patreon campaign, was the 2017–2018 pitch by Ryan McMahon, for Canadaland's investigative podcast, Thunder Bay. McMahon pitched Thunder Bay as the S-Town, of the north, in reference to the popular investigative journalism podcast by producers of Serial about a town in Alabama. By November they had surpassed their "funding threshold", an unprecedented success. McMahon, was "blown away by the support—not just from people across the country, but within Thunder Bay itself."

Critical receptionThe Globe and Mail's Simon Houpt compared Brown to an "action star in a Hollywood blow-'em-up: throwing fireballs and kicking asses" but added "he has a track record of playing fast and loose with facts".

In the Toronto Life review of Toronto's most "addictive podcasts" in 2016, Vibhu Gairola, included Canadaland. Gairola wrote that "Unless you're a journalist, you probably know Canadaland as that podcast that broke the Ghomeshi scandal". While Canadaland self-described as a "non-sensationalist watchdog and a flag bearer for responsible reporting", Brown is known for routinely challeng[ing] and condemn[ing] the big names in Canadian news." Gairola compared Canadaland to "earnest whistle-blowing of TVO's The Agenda With Steve Paikin or HBO's Real Time with Bill Maher''.

National Post's Christie Blatchford wrote that Canadaland's 2017 fake obituary by Indigenous journalist and activist Robert Jago on Canadaland's website, of the Post's founder, former publisher, columnist, and Blatchford's former employer—Conrad Black—was "vicious", "petty and unfunny." Blatchford called it "a cruel and juvenile piece that no newspaper would ever publish, let alone with such relish. It shames the profession."

References

External links
 

Canadian podcasters
Internet television channels
Podcasting companies
2013 podcast debuts
News podcasts
Canadian podcasts